Julianna Révész, (born 24 January 1983) is a Hungarian épée fencer. With Hungary she won a silver medal in the 2005 World Fencing Championships in Leipzig and a bronze medal in the 2013 European Fencing Championships in Zagreb. She is the co-founder of Knightsbridge Fencing Club along with Tamas Kovacs.

Career 

Révész's parents wanted to choose a sport for her in which Hungarians were traditionally successful, such as fencing. At age 8 she was taken to the Erdert Medosz Fencing Club, where she fell in love with the sport. She did one year of footwork and private lesson with foil. Later she changed to épée when she transferred to BVSC Fencing Club. As soon as she started to compete in children's tournaments, people recognized her talent for fencing. Révész became Hungarian National Champion in all age categories from children to adult, in both individual and team events. Her first coaches were Zoltán Beszédes and Lászlo Kőrösi.

Révész won a bronze medal at the 2001 Junior European Championships in Keszthely.

In 2001 Révész moved to Germany Tauberbischofsheim where she studied and fenced full-time at the famous Tauberbischofsheim Fecht Club. Her trainer was Mariusz Strzałka. In 2002 she was ranked no.1 in the world and was winner of the World Cup series. Two years later she moved back to Hungary. From 2005 to 2008 she represented Team Hungary at the World and European Championships.

Amongst seniors, she was a member of the Hungarian team that won a silver medal in the 2005 World Fencing Championships in Leipzig and a bronze medal in the 2013 European Fencing Championships in Zagreb. In the 2014 Doha Grand Prix she earned her first podium in the Fencing World Cup after defeating world no.1 Ana Maria Brânză 8–7 in the quarter-finals. Révész was stopped in the semi-finals by Tiffany Géroudet and won a bronze medal.

In 2009, Révész founded Knightsbridge Fencing Club in London along with Tamás Kovács.

Personal life 

Révész has lived in London, United Kingdom since 2008 with her husband, and child.

References 

1983 births
Living people
Hungarian female épée fencers